Alexandra Gardiner Creel (February 7, 1910 - December 19, 1990) was a member of the Gardiner family, who were prominent bankers and landowners, known for their ownership of  Gardiners Island, located off the eastern tip of Long Island, New York.

Early life and education 
Creel was born on February 7, 1910, in New York City, to Robert Alexander Gardiner (1863-1919) and Nora Loftus, a native of County Kilkenny in Ireland. Her brother Robert David Lion Gardiner (1911-2004) was the last proprietor of Gardiners Island, New York, who died without leaving any biological children. 

Her father's estate in 1919, was estimated at $1,000,000 in a trust to raise her and her elder brother.  In 1921, her mother went to court to challenge the terms of the trust, claiming she was not able to maintain her children with the funds the managers released.

Life 
In 1932, Gardiner quietly married James Randall Creel (1904-1990), a judge of the New York City Criminal Court, which was reported by The New York Times, without telling her family. They reported her mother confronted the minister who performed the marriage, and she was so upset she had to be calmed by the Chief of Police.

Her aunt Sarah Diodati Gardiner, who had purchased Gardiners Island from her cousin Winthrop Gardiner Jr., in 1936, created a trust so she could leave the island to her and her brother, Robert David Lion Gardiner.  The trust would pay the taxes and costs to maintain the property, but the terms of the trust did not allow them to sell the Island.  Alexandra and Robert became the beneficiaries of the trust upon their aunt's death in January 1953. The trust's money was depleted in the 1970s.

Alexandra's death left a long-running dispute between her brother and her daughter Alexandra Creel Goelet over the future of the island, which the Gardiner family first acquired in a manorial grant from the King of England in 1639.

Personal life 
Creel had two children with James Randall Creel;

 James Randall Creel, III. (1934-1988), who married Diana Millicent, and had the following children;
 Jamie Creel (b. c. 1964), who owns Creel & Gow, a curiosity shop in New York City and Millbrook, New York
 Alexandra Gardiner Creel (*1940), married Robert Guestier Goelet (1923-2019), a philanthropist of French origin, with whom she had the following children;
 Alexandra Gardiner Goelet (b. c. 1977), who runs the family investment office along with her younger brother Robert.
 Robert Gardiner Goelet (b. c. 1979), a former project manager for the Lower Manhattan Development Corporation.

References

Gardiner family
1910 births
1990 deaths